Marcel R.M. van den Brink (born November 14, 1960) is a Dutch oncologist and researcher at Memorial Sloan Kettering Cancer Center known for his research in hematopoietic stem cell transplantation for cancer patients.

Career 

van den Brink obtained his M.D. and Ph.D. from the University of Leiden, completed a postdoctoral fellowship at the Pittsburgh Cancer Institute in Pittsburgh, PA and residency at Duke University Medical Center in Durham, NC. From 1994 to 1997, van den Brink was a Clinical Fellow in Hematology and Oncology at Beth Israel Deaconess Medical Center and a Clinical Fellow in Medicine at Harvard Medical School in Boston, MA. He then carried out a post-doctoral fellowship at the Dana Farber Cancer Institute in Boston, MA from 1995 to 1999.

He is now the Head of the Division of Hematologic Malignancies and Alan Houghton Chair in Immunology at Memorial Sloan Kettering Cancer Center (MSKCC), as well as Professor at Gerstner Sloan Kettering Graduate School of Biomedical Sciences and Weill Cornell Graduate School of Medical Sciences. He is the Co-Director of the Parker Institute for Cancer Immunotherapy. He is also chairman of DKMS Stiftung Leben Spenden. He is a member of the American Society for Clinical Investigation and the Association of American Physicians. He has been elected to the Royal Netherlands Academy of Arts and Sciences (Koninklijke Nederlandse Akademie van Wetenschappen, or KNAW) as a Foreign Member of Medical, Biomedical and Health Sciences. KNAW Members consist of leading scientists across all disciplines and are chosen for their scientific achievements.

Research
As a physician-scientist, van den Brink studies cancer immunotherapy with a special interest in bone marrow transplantation, T cell therapies and immune reconstitution. Van den Brink has made a large number of discoveries regarding the role of the thymus in immune reconstitution after bone marrow transplantation, the pathophysiology of graft-versus-host disease and how changes in the gut flora can affect bone marrow transplantation. From years of research on the relationship between microbiota and GVHD, he has discovered that antibiotic treatment slows down regrowth of immune cells after transplant by depleting gut flora, lactose in the diet feeds dangerous gut bacteria when the immune system is compromised in mice, and a bacterial species called Blautia producta can prevent infections and GVHD in bone marrow transplantation patients. He has published over 200 articles that have helped improve therapeutic strategies for cancer patients.

Awards 

 1996 Physician Scientist Award, Howard Hughes Medical Institute
 1999 Amy Strelzer Manasevit Scholar Award
 2001 Damon Runyon Scholar Award, Cancer Research Fund
 2004 Member of the American Society for Clinical Investigation
 2013 Member of the Association of American Physicians
 2014 Immunology Letters Lecture Award, European Federation of Immunological Societies
 2015 Delete Blood Cancer Award, DKMS
 2015 Till and McCulloch Lectureship Award
 2020 Foreign member of the Royal Netherlands Academy of Arts and Sciences

Selected publications

Schluter J, Peled JU, Taylor BP, Markey KA, Smith M, Taur Y, Niehus R, Staffas A, Dai A, Fontana E, Amoretti LA, Wright RJ, Morjaria S, Fenelus M, Pessin MS, Chao NJ, Lew M, Bohannon L, Bush A, Sung AD, Hohl TM, Perales MA, van den Brink MRM, Xavier JB. "The gut microbiota is associated with immune cell dynamics in humans". Nature. 2020 Dec; 588(7837):303-307. PMID: 33239790. PMCID: PMC7725892.
Peled JU, Gomes ALC, Devlin SM, Littmann ER, Taur Y, Sung AD, Weber D, Hashimoto D, Slingerland AE, Slingerland JB, Maloy M, Clurman AG, Stein-Thoeringer CK, Markey KA, Docampo MD, Burgos da Silva M, Khan N, Gessner A, Messina JA, Romero K, Lew MV, Bush A, Bohannon L, Brereton DG, Fontana E, Amoretti LA, Wright RJ, Armijo GK, Shono Y, Sanchez-Escamilla M, Castillo Flores N, Alarcon Tomas A, Lin RJ, Yáñez San Segundo L, Shah GL, Cho C, Scordo M, Politikos I, Hayasaka K, Hasegawa Y, Gyurkocza B, Ponce DM, Barker JN, Perales MA, Giralt SA, Jenq RR, Teshima T, Chao NJ, Holler E, Xavier JB, Pamer EG, van den Brink MRM. "Microbiota as Predictor of Mortality in Allogeneic Hematopoietic-Cell Transplantation". N Engl J Med. 2020 Feb 27;382(9):822-834. PMID: 32101664. PMCID: PMC7534690.
Tsai JJ, Takahashi K, Dudakov JA, Shieh J, Singer NV, West ML, Smith OM, Young LF, Holland AM, Shono Y, Ghosh A, Tran HT, Moore MAS, van den Brink MRM. "Nrf2 regulates haematopoietic stem cell function". Nature Cell Biology. 2013; 15(3): 309-16. ; .
Hanash AM, Dudakov JA, Hua G, O'Connor MH, Young LF, Singer NV, West ML, Jenq RR, Holland AM, Kappel LW, Ghosh A, Tsai JJ, Rao UK, Yim NL, Smith OM, Velardi E, Liu C, Fouser LA, Kolesnick R, Blazar BR, van den Brink MRM. "IL-22 protects intestinal stem cells from immune-mediated tissue damage and regulates sensitivity to graft vs. host disease". Immunity. 2012; 37:339-350. (Previews in Immunity 2012; 37:196). ; .
Jenq RR, Ubeda C, Taur Y, Menezes CC, Khanin R, Dudakov JA, Liu C, West ML, Singer NV, Equinda MJ, Gobourne A, Lipuma L, Young LF, Smith OM, Ghosh S, Hanash AM, Goldberg JD, Aoyama K, Blazar BR, Pamer EG, van den Brink MRM. "Regulation of intestinal inflammation by microbiota following allogeneic bone marrow transplantation". Journal of Experimental Medicine. 2012; 209:903-911. (Research Highlight in Nature Reviews Immunology 2012; 12:399) ; .
Dudakov JA, Hanash AM, Jenq RR, Young LF, Singer NV, West ML, Smith OM, Holland AM, Tsai JJ, Boyd RL, van den Brink MRM. "IL-22 drives endogenous thymic regeneration in mice". Science. 2012; 336:91-95. (Perspectives in Science 2012; 336:40; Leading Edge Select in Cell 2012; 149:729) ; .
Zakrzewski JL, Suh D, Markley JC, Smith OM, King C, Goldberg GL, Jenq R. Holland AM, Grubin J, Cabrera-Perez J, Brentjens RJ, Lu SX, Rizzuto G, Sant'Angelo DB, Riviere I, Sadelain M, Heller G, Zuniga-Pflucker JC, Liu C, van den Brink MRM. "Tumor immunotherapy across MHC barriers using allogeneic T-cell precursors". Nature Biotechnology 2008; 4:453-461. (commentary in Nature Reviews in Immunology 2008; 8:321) ; .
Zakrzewski JL, Kochman AA, Lu SX, Terwey TH, Kim TD, Hubbard VM, Muriglan SJ, Suh D, Cabrera-Perez J, Radhakrishnan R, Heller G, Zuniga-Pflucker JC, Alpdogan O, van den Brink MRM. "Adoptive transfer of T-cell precursors enhances T-cell reconstitution after allogeneic hematopoietic stem cell transplantation". Nature Medicine 2006; 12:1039-1047. .
Schmaltz C, Alpdogan O, Kappel BJ, Muriglan SJ, Rotolo JA, Ongchin J, Willis LM, Greenberg AS, Eng JM, Crawford JM, Murphy GF, Yagita H, Walczak H, Peschon J, van den Brink MRM. "T cells require TRAIL for optimal graft-versus-tumor activity". Nature Medicine 2002; 8:1433-1437. .

References 

Date of birth missing (living people)
1960 births
Dutch hematologists
People from Oegstgeest
Living people
Members of the Royal Netherlands Academy of Arts and Sciences
Memorial Sloan Kettering Cancer Center physicians